Patrick Scherrer (born 20 December 1986) is an Austrian football midfielder currently playing for FC Hard.

He previously played for SC Austria Lustenau, SK Sturm Graz and SC Rheindorf Altach.

References

1986 births
Living people
Austrian footballers
SK Sturm Graz players
SC Rheindorf Altach players
USV Eschen/Mauren players
Association football midfielders
People from Feldkirch, Vorarlberg
Footballers from Vorarlberg